Power 99 may refer to:

Power 99 FM Radio 99  Islamabad 
Power 99 FM Radio 99  Abbottabad 
Power 99 FM Radio 99  Vehari 
WUSL FM 98.9  Philadelphia
KUJ FM 99.1 Kennewick, Washington
KZGU FM 99.5 Saipan 
WRKW FM 99.1 Ebensburg, Pennsylvania 
CFMM-FM 99.1 Prince Albert, Saskatchewan 
WAPW FM 99.7 Atlanta, now WWWQ-FM, Q100
KCPX FM 98.7 Salt Lake City, now KBEE-FM, B98.7